Dronagiri  railway station is a proposed railway station in Navi Mumbai's Raigad district, Maharashtra. Its code is DRNGR. It will serve Dronagiri area of Navi Mumbai,  near Uran, Navi Mumbai. The station proposed includes two platforms.

References

Railway stations in Raigad district
Mumbai CR railway division
Transport in Navi Mumbai
Proposed railway stations in India
Mumbai Suburban Railway stations